The Many Saints of Newark (marketed with the subtitle A Sopranos Story) is a 2021 American crime drama film directed by Alan Taylor and written by David Chase and Lawrence Konner. A prequel to Chase's HBO crime drama series The Sopranos, it takes place during the 1960s and 1970s in Newark, New Jersey. The film follows a violent gang war from the perspectives of mobster Dickie Moltisanti and his teenage nephew, Tony Soprano, in the midst of the city's 1967 riots. It stars Alessandro Nivola as Dickie and Michael Gandolfini as Tony, the character originated by his father in the series, with Leslie Odom Jr., Jon Bernthal, Corey Stoll, Billy Magnussen, Michela De Rossi, John Magaro, Ray Liotta, and Vera Farmiga in supporting roles.

Warner Bros. Pictures and New Line Cinema obtained the rights to produce The Many Saints of Newark alongside HBO Films. The film had its world premiere at the Tribeca Fall Preview on September 22, 2021, and was theatrically released in the United States on October 1, along with a month-long simultaneous release on the HBO Max streaming service. The film received generally positive reviews from critics, with many praising the performances of Gandolfini and Nivola, though some criticized the script. During its theatrical release, the film grossed $13 million against a budget of $50 million, but it was a streaming success on HBO Max and contributed to a spike in viewership for The Sopranos.

Plot 

In 1967, a young Tony Soprano travels with his mentor, Dickie Moltisanti, to welcome home Dickie's father, "Hollywood Dick" Moltisanti, and his new Italian bride, Giuseppina. Moltisanti is a soldier in the DiMeo crime family, which also consists of Johnny Soprano and his brother Junior, Silvio Dante, Paulie Walnuts, Pussy Bonpensiero, and "Buddha", Pussy Bonpensiero's father. After a black taxi driver is assaulted and robbed by white police officers, riots break out in Newark. One of Dickie's black associates, Harold McBrayer, begins to take part in the riots. Harold kills a man stealing from their business, forcing him to flee to North Carolina. Before leaving, he gets $500 from Dickie as a gift.

At a carnival, Tony sees Johnny and Junior arrested and Johnny is sentenced to four years in prison for assault with a deadly weapon. During an argument, Hollywood Dick kicks Giuseppina down a flight of stairs. When Dickie finds out, he confronts him. An argument leads to a physical altercation where Dickie kills his father in a fit of rage. He takes the body to one of Hollywood Dick's businesses and burns it down to make it look like it was destroyed in the riots.

Guilt-ridden, Dickie visits his father's twin brother, Sally, who is serving a life sentence in prison for killing another made man in his own family. He also begins seeing Giuseppina as his comare. In elementary school, Tony is suspended from school for starting a gambling operation, and Dickie makes Tony pinkie promise him that he will follow the rules.

In early 1972, Johnny is released from prison and Harold returns to Newark determined to start his own black-led criminal operation. Giuseppina also has an affair with Harold after a fight with Dickie. Harold kills one of Dickie's men and steals their extortion money. Dickie and his crew torture and question one of Harold's gang members with an impact wrench and then kill him. In retaliation for Cyril's death, Harold and his gang engage in a drive-by shootout with Johnny Boy's crew, during which Buddha is killed. Harold and Dickie engage in a standoff, but both leave when they hear police sirens.

After Tony steals the answers for his geometry exam, the school guidance counselor tells Tony's mother, Livia, that he has a high Stanford–Binet IQ and the Myers–Briggs personality traits of a leader. The counselor also relates how Tony told her about a time in which his mother hugged him and read him a book about Sutter's Mill and how it was one of his best memories. Livia tries to show her affection for Tony, but she mentions how her doctor wanted to prescribe her antidepressants. When Tony suggests taking it, she antagonizes him. At Buddha's wake, Tony asks Dickie if he could get Elavil for his mother, but Dickie is hesitant.

After the wake, Junior slips and falls on the church steps, causing Dickie to laugh uproariously in his face, infuriating Junior. Dickie reconnects with Giuseppina and promises her a beauty parlor for her to run. During a walk on the beach, she confesses to her affair with Harold. An enraged Dickie drowns her in the ocean. Dickie again visits Sally, who suspects Dickie of murdering both his brother and Giuseppina. Sally says that everyone close to Dickie ends up dead sooner or later, and that he should stay out of Tony's life.

Dickie listens to Sally's advice and begins to avoid Tony, refusing to see him or answer his calls. An upset Tony throws the speakers Dickie gave him out his window. Later that night, Silvio encourages Dickie to reconcile with Tony, and Dickie relents. Before he can arrive home, Dickie is shot in the back of the head by an unknown assailant on Junior's orders.

At Dickie's wake, it is revealed that Dickie did acquire the Elavil for Tony, and had it in his pocket when he was killed. Tony looks sadly at Dickie's corpse and imagines doing another pinkie promise with him, like the two had done years before. Some time later, Harold moves into a white neighborhood, his organized crime operation having apparently become a success.

Cast

Other notable appearances include Lesli Margherita as Iris Balducci, Kathryn Kates as Angie DeCarlo, Nick Vallelonga as Carmine Cotuso, and Ed Marinaro as Jilly Ruffalo. Robert Vincent Montano and Matteo Russo play Artie Bucco at varying ages, Chase Vacnin portrays the teenage Jackie Aprile, Oberon K.A. Adjepong plays Frank Lucas, and Lauren DiMario plays the teenage Carmela De Angelis, Tony's future wife.

Production

Development

The origins of what ultimately took shape as The Many Saints of Newark happened when David Chase finished film school, having the idea of making a film about four white persons living around Newark, New Jersey, who joined the National Guard to avoid being drafted to the Vietnam War only to be sent instead to the 1967 Newark riots, though the film went unproduced. Following the release of The Sopranos, Chase was suggested by Oz creator Tom Fontana to write a film centered on Tony Soprano's father Giovanni "Johnny Boy" Soprano set in the 1930s or 1940s. However, the idea eventually fell off due to Chase's lack of interest.

Chase ruled out the idea of continuing The Sopranos story in June 2017, while simultaneously expressing an interest in a prequel to the series. He had earlier been against the idea of making a film based on The Sopranos, especially a sequel to the series, given James Gandolfini's death in 2013, but became interested in Newark due to the 1967 Newark riots and his family ties to the city: "I was interested in Newark and life in Newark at that time ... I used to go to down there every Saturday night for dinner with my grandparents. But the thing that interested me most was Tony's boyhood. I was interested in exploring that", acknowledging that a prequel film could explore the period of Tony's life that he glorified in the show's early episodes.

Chase said that the main storyline centers on the 1967 Newark riots and racial tensions between the Italian-American and African-American communities. Chase's biggest challenge during writing was the inclusion of many storylines for different characters; some aspects of those storylines were dropped during editing to let the storylines "take shape" within the film's overall narrative.

In March 2018, New Line Cinema announced that it purchased the rights to produce the film along with HBO Films, with Chase co-writing the screenplay with Lawrence Konner. New Line's chairman, Toby Emmerich, stated, "David is a masterful storyteller and we, along with our colleagues at HBO, are thrilled that he has decided to revisit, and enlarge, the Soprano universe in a feature film". Chase was not concerned about alienating audiences unfamiliar to the show; for him and Konner, their intention was to tell a realistic and respectable dramatic criminal story, under the "auspices" of The Sopranos.

Alan Taylor, who directed several episodes of The Sopranos, was hired to direct the film in July 2018. Chase offered Taylor to direct the film one day while they lunched together, feeling that Taylor had worked in the show's best episodes and had given him "the most trouble". In contrast to the show, Taylor felt that Chase allowed more creative control over the film than when he ran the show, as Chase spent most of the time outlining the story sequestered in the writer's room.

Casting

In November 2018, Alessandro Nivola was cast to star in the film as Dickie Moltisanti, the father of Christopher Moltisanti. Dickie never appeared in the show despite being mentioned, though Chase did not have any plans to feature the character physically then. In January 2019, while discussing the 20th anniversary of the series, Chase revealed that a young Tony Soprano would appear in the film. Jon Bernthal, Vera Farmiga, Corey Stoll and Billy Magnussen were added to the cast that same month.

Michael Gandolfini, son of James Gandolfini, was cast in the role of young Tony. He was not immediately cast and had to audition for the role, but Taylor and Chase felt that they were right in casting him when Gandolfini thanked all the production team for allowing him to "say hello and goodbye again" to his father. Gandolfini, having never watched The Sopranos, watched through it to prepare for the role, describing it as an intense process. To keep Gandolfini's performance from being too similar to that of his father, Taylor occasionally reshot a scene if Gandolfini acted like he were already an experienced gangster, as the young Tony is "still a kid" during the film.

Ray Liotta joined the cast in February, with Leslie Odom Jr. and Michela De Rossi joining in March, as well as John Magaro, who starred in Chase's debut feature film Not Fade Away (2012). Liotta had been previously approached by Chase to appear in the third or fourth seasons of The Sopranos, but the plan did not work out.

Edie Falco filmed scenes as her character Carmela Soprano which were intended to start the film, but her scenes were cut. Taylor explained, "There was some confusion as to how best launch the movie. How to start the movie. So we tried a few things and that was one of them. If you've seen the movie you'll see that we begin it in a very different way now but that wasn't always the idea".

Filming
Principal photography began in Brooklyn on April 3, 2019, moved to Newark on May 7, and wrapped in June 2019, with a $50 million budget. Branford Place, a street in Newark, was transformed to fit the 1960s time period for the riots, including detailed storefronts, the old Adams Theatre marquee, and the retro neon sign for Hobby's Delicatessen. Luther Engler, a retired Newark police officer, served as a technical adviser for the film.

Filming also took place in Bloomfield. Satriale's Pork Store, which was featured in The Sopranos, was recreated in Paterson. Planned reshoots were halted upon the start of the COVID-19 pandemic, and the production ultimately returned for reshoots in September 2020, during which the filmmakers shot some important aspects that improved the film's story.

The film uses the 1967 Newark riots as a backdrop for the tensions between the Italian-American and African-American communities. To accurately depict the riots, due to his penchant for historical exactitude given his past career as a history professor, Taylor directly recreated some of the film shots from archival photos and footage of the event, even if doing so could keep some scenes from feeling as sensational as they could have been.

During post-production, there were some serious talks about if the film's depiction of the Newark riots would still seem appropriate in the wake of the George Floyd protests, but after showing the movie to some consultants and Odom Jr., Taylor concluded that the film was made in a way that it became more heightened and conscious enough to avoid controversy. Christopher Tellefsen worked as the film's editor. The editing process took longer than expected due to the COVID-19 pandemic's impact on the film industry, though Taylor felt the extended period helped him and Chase to discuss what the film's final cut would consist of together.

Release
The film was initially scheduled to be released on September 25, 2020; however, due to the impact of the COVID-19 pandemic on theaters and the film industry, its release date was rescheduled to March 12, 2021. It was then delayed again to September 24, 2021, so it could premiere on the film festival circuit and better position itself as an awards contender, before later moving to October 1.

The film was simultaneously released in theaters and on HBO Max (for a limited period of 31 days), as part of the 2021 Warner Bros. film release schedule plans. The film had its world premiere at the inaugural Tribeca Fall Preview at the Beacon Theatre on September 22, 2021, the same date as the film's early release in the United Kingdom.

The film was released on Blu-ray, 4K Ultra HD and DVD on December 21, 2021. Special features include deleted scenes and two featurettes–"Making of Newark" and "Sopranos Family Honor". It debuted at the 33rd position for overall disc sales in the United States according to the "NPD VideoScan First Alert" chart, and the 18th position in Blu-ray sales. Blu-ray accounted for 60% of sales, with traditional Blu-ray making up 48% of the sales and Ultra HD Blu-ray making up 12%.

Reception

Box office 
The Many Saints of Newark grossed $8.2million in the United States and Canada, and $4.8million in other territories, for a worldwide total of $13.1million.

In the United States and Canada, The Many Saints of Newark was released alongside Venom: Let There Be Carnage and The Addams Family 2, and was projected to gross around $10 million from 3,180 theaters in its opening weekend. The film made $2.1 million on its first day, and debuted to $5 million, finishing fourth at the box office. Following its less-than-expected opening weekend, Variety wrote that the film "stands to lose millions". The film dropped 69% in its second weekend to $1.9 million, finishing fifth.

Streaming viewership
The Many Saints of Newark was a streaming success; according to Samba TV, it was viewed one million times during its opening weekend. The show skewed slightly  Caucasian at +3%, with Philadelphia, PAC overindexed the most (+116%) in market DMAs, followed by Boston, MA (+97%) and Chicago, IL (+57%). It outperformed similarly-budgeted films like Reminiscence and Cry Macho that were released on HBO Max, with WarnerMedia stating it was streamed three times more than the second-most viewed film of the weekend. The Sopranos also broke HBO Max viewership records around the time of the film's release, attributed to The Many Saints of Newark sparking renewed interest in the series. By the end of its first month, the film had been streamed in over 2.1 million households in the United States. During its second as well as the final week of availability on HBO Max, the film was the eighth-most-streamed-film in the United States according to TV Time.

Critical response
The site's critical consensus reads, "Even as its storytelling chafes at the edges of its cinematic constraints, The Many Saints of Newark proves The Sopranos allure is still powerful." On Metacritic, the film has a weighted average score of 61 out of 100, based on 48 critics, indicating "generally favorable reviews". Audiences polled by CinemaScore gave the film an average grade of "C+" on an A+ to F scale, while those at PostTrak gave it a 77% positive score, with 60% saying they would definitely recommend it.

In a review for The Boston Globe, Don Aucoin said that "as a Goodfellas-ish crime drama that vividly evokes time and place, Saints is rendered with enough bare-knuckled verve, unpredictability, and darkly glinting wit to make it work." In a positive review for the Chicago Sun-Times, Richard Roeper called the film "a sharply honed, darkly funny, ultra-violent and wildly entertaining late 1960s period piece" and an "immensely satisfying companion piece to The Sopranos", giving it 3.5 stars out of 4.

Owen Gleiberman of Variety called Many Saints "a sharp, lively, and engrossing movie, one that provides a fascinating running commentary on how the world of 'The Sopranos' came into being" but noted "[the audience] can’t help but notice the difference in tone" when compared to the series. David Fear of Rolling Stone said in his review "Chase has delivered something that walks the tightrope between social melodrama and fan service, and that sometimes teeters on the edge of falling."

Manohla Dargis of The New York Times called the film "a busy, unnecessary, disappointingly ordinary origin story" and said that "the best thing about The Many Saints of Newark is that it makes you think about The Sopranos, but that's also the worst thing about it." Reviewing the film for RogerEbert.com, Glenn Kenny gave the film 1.5 out of 4 stars and said:
"The movie's flabbiness, its unfocused flopping from scene to scene, its disinclination to provide any individual scene with any dimension beyond its immediate impact, practically vitiates the entire theme of Dickie's ostensible mentorship of Tony Soprano." Richard Brody of The New Yorker wrote: "The Many Saints of Newark, by contrast, reduces characters of potentially mythic power to a handful of defining traits and pins them to a diorama-like backdrop of historical readymades."

Possible sequel
Chase has expressed interest in producing a sequel to The Many Saints of Newark that follows Tony Soprano in his 20s, provided he could collaborate with former Sopranos writer Terence Winter. Upon hearing this, Winter replied he would do it "in a heartbeat. Absolutely."

Chase revealed he received an offer from WarnerMedia to produce another season of The Sopranos that bridged the gap between the end of the film and the beginning of the original series, but admitted to The Hollywood Reporter he was not especially interested in making such a series. However, he noted he wished to make one more film set in The Sopranos universe because he had an idea of what he might do, "But I don't think they want that."

References

External links 
 
 

2021 crime drama films
2021 films
American crime drama films
American gangster films
Culture of Newark, New Jersey
Films about African-American organized crime
Films about the American Mafia
Films based on television series
Films directed by Alan Taylor
Films impacted by the COVID-19 pandemic
Films postponed due to the COVID-19 pandemic
Films set in New Jersey
Films set in the 1960s
Films set in the 1970s
Films shot in New York City
Films shot in Newark, New Jersey
HBO Films films
HBO Max films
New Line Cinema films
Patricide in fiction
The Sopranos
Warner Bros. films
Newark, New Jersey in fiction
2020s English-language films
2020s American films